Davit Gigauri is a Georgian rugby union player who played as a lock for US Colomiers in the Pro D2 and the Georgia national team.

References

1994 births
Living people
Expatriate rugby union players from Georgia (country)
Rugby union players from Georgia (country)
Georgia international rugby union players
CSM București (rugby union) players
US Colomiers players
The Black Lion players
Rugby union locks